The early domes of the Middle Ages, particularly in those areas recently under Byzantine control, were an extension of earlier Roman architecture. The domed church architecture of Italy from the sixth to the eighth centuries followed that of the Byzantine provinces and, although this influence diminishes under Charlemagne, it continued on in Venice, Southern Italy, and Sicily. Charlemagne's Palatine Chapel is a notable exception, being influenced by Byzantine models from Ravenna and Constantinople. The Dome of the Rock, an Umayyad Muslim religious shrine built in Jerusalem, was designed similarly to nearby Byzantine martyria and Christian churches. Domes were also built as part of Muslim palaces, throne halls, pavilions, and baths, and blended elements of both Byzantine and Persian architecture, using both pendentives and squinches. The origin of the crossed-arch dome type is debated, but the earliest known example is from the tenth century at the Great Mosque of Córdoba. In Egypt, a "keel" shaped dome profile was characteristic of Fatimid architecture. The use of squinches became widespread in the Islamic world by the tenth and eleventh centuries. Bulbous domes were used to cover large buildings in Syria after the eleventh century, following an architectural revival there, and the present shape of the Dome of the Rock's dome likely dates from this time.

Christian domes in Romanesque church architecture, especially those of the Holy Roman Empire, are generally octagonal on squinches and hidden externally within crossing towers, beginning around 1050. An example is the church of San Michele Maggiore in Pavia, Italy. St. Mark's Basilica in Venice, with its five domes on pendentives modeled on the Byzantine Church of the Holy Apostles, was built from 1063 to 1072. Domes on pendentives, apparently based upon Byzantine models, appear in the Aquitaine region of France after the beginning of the Crusades in 1095, such as the abbey church of Fontevrault, where Richard the Lionheart was buried. A series of centrally planned churches were built by the Knights Templar throughout Europe, modeled on the Church of the Holy Sepulchre, with the Dome of the Rock at their Temple Mount headquarters also an influence. Distinctive domes on pendentives were built in Spain during the Reconquista. Gothic domes are uncommon due to the use of rib vaults over naves and with church crossings usually focused instead by tall steeples, but there are examples of small octagonal crossing domes in cathedrals as the style developed from the Romanesque. The octagonal dome of Florence Cathedral was a result of the expansion plans for that church from the 14th century, a part of efforts in Tuscany to build domes with exposed external profiles.

The muqarnas dome type may have originated in Abbasid Iraq as single brick shells of large squinch-like cells, but it was popular in North Africa and Spain with more intricate cell patterns in stucco on a wooden inner shell. Two outstanding examples from the Moorish palace of the Alhambra in Granada, Spain, are the 14th century Hall of the Abencerrajes and Hall of the two Sisters. In 14th century Egypt, the Mamluks began building stone domes, rather than brick, for the tombs of sultans and emirs and would construct hundreds of them over the next two and a half centuries. Externally, their supporting structures are distinguished by chamfered or stepped angles and round windows in a triangular arrangement. A variety of shapes for the domes themselves were used, such as bulbous, ogee, and keel-shaped, and they included carved patterns in spirals, zigzags, and floral designs. Bulbous minarets from Egypt spread to Syria in the 15th century and would influence the use of bulbous domes in the architecture of northwest Europe, having become associated with the Holy Land by pilgrims. In the Low Countries of northwest Europe, multi-story spires with truncated bulbous cupolas supporting smaller cupolas or crowns became popular in the sixteenth century.

Early Middle Ages

Post-Roman areas 

Although the chronology in uncertain for some examples, domes continued to be built in Italy throughout the Middle Ages. Dome construction appears to have stopped in the city of Rome in the middle of the 5th century, but there are dozens of Italian examples outside of Rome from the next few centuries. Continuing from late antiquity, domes in the early Middle Ages were built over centralized buildings such as baptisteries and martyria. Domed baptisteries built in 6th century Italy include Albenga Baptistery and those of Canosa di Puglia and Nocera Superiore.

The building projects of Theodoric the Great, the Ostrogothic king of Italy, largely continued existing architectural conventions. His Arian Baptistry in Ravenna (c. 500), for example, closely echoes the Baptistry of Neon built before it. The Mausoleum of Theodoric, however, was understood by contemporaries to be remarkable. Begun in 520, the  dome over the mausoleum was carved out of a single 440-ton slab of limestone and positioned some time between 522 and 526. The low saucer shape of the monolithic dome, which is estimated to be more than 230 tons of Istrian stone, may have been chosen to avoid radial cracking. The twelve brackets carved as part of the dome's exterior are thought to have been used to maneuver the piece into place. The choice of large limestone blocks for the structure is significant as the most common construction material in the West at that time was brick. It is likely that foreign artisans were brought to Ravenna to build the structure; possibly from Syria, where such stonework was used in contemporary buildings.

The Syria and Palestine area has a long tradition of domical architecture, including wooden domes in shapes described as "conoid", or similar to pine cones. When the Arab Muslim forces conquered the region, they employed local craftsmen for their buildings and, by the end of the 7th century, the dome had begun to become an architectural symbol of Islam. The rapidity of this adoption was likely aided by the Arab religious traditions, which predate Islam, of both domed structures to cover the burial places of ancestors and the use of a round tabernacle tent with a dome-like top made of red leather for housing idols. Early versions of bulbous domes can be seen in mosaic illustrations in Syria dating to the Umayyad period. They were used to cover large buildings in Syria after the eleventh century.

Umayyad Caliphate 

The Dome of the Rock in Jerusalem, the earliest surviving Islamic building, was completed in 691 by Umayyad caliph Abd Al-Malik. Its design was that of a ciborium, or reliquary, such as those common to Byzantine martyria and the major Christian churches of the city. The rotunda of the nearby Church of the Holy Sepulchre, in particular, has a similar design and almost the same dimensions. The building was reportedly burned in the eleventh century and then rebuilt, which would still make it one of the oldest timber buildings in the world. The dome, a double shell design made of wood, is 20.44 meters in diameter. The dome's bulbous shape "probably dates from the eleventh century." Several restorations since 1958 to address structural damage have resulted in the extensive replacement of tiles, mosaics, ceilings, and walls such that "nearly everything that one sees in this marvelous building was put there in the second half of the twentieth century", but without significant change to its original form and structure. It is currently covered in gilded aluminum.

In addition to religious shrines, domes were used over the audience and throne halls of Umayyad palaces, and as part of porches, pavilions, fountains, towers and the calderia of baths. Blending the architectural features of both the Byzantine and Persian architecture, the domes used both pendentives and squinches and were made in a variety of shapes and materials. A dome stood at the center of the palace-city of Baghdad and, similarly but on a smaller scale, there are literary accounts of a domed audience hall in the palace of Abu Muslim in Merv at the meeting point of four iwans arranged along the cardinal directions.

Muslim palaces included domical halls as early as the eighth century, well before domes became standard elements of mosque architecture. The early eighth century palace of Khirbat al-Minya included a domed gateway. The palace of Qasr Mshatta and a ninth century palace at Samarra included domed throne rooms. A domed structure covered a shallow pool in the main courtyard of the mid eighth century palace of Khirbat al-Mafjar. Similar examples at mosques, such as the domed fountains at the Mosque of Ibn Tulun (destroyed in 987 and replaced with a different structure), at Maarrat al-Numan, in Nishapur, Tripoli, and at the Mosque of Damascus seem to be related to this element of palace architecture, although they were later used as part of ritual ablution.

The calderia of early Islamic bath complexes at Amra, Sarraj, and Anjar were roofed with stone or brick domes. The caldarium of the early Islamic bath at Qasr Amra contains "the most completely preserved astronomical cupola decoration", a decorative idea for bath domes that would long continue in the Islamic world.

The placement of a dome in front of the mihrab of a mosque probably began with the rebuilding of the Prophet's Mosque in Medina by Umayyad Caliph Al-Walid. This was likely to emphasize the place of the ruler, although domes would eventually become focal points of decoration and architectural composition or indicate the direction of prayer. Later developments of this feature would include additional domes oriented axially to the mihrab dome. Byzantine workmen built the Umayyad Mosque of Damascus and its hemispherical dome for al Walid in 705. The dome rests upon an octagonal base formed by squinches. The dome, called the "Dome of the Eagle" or "Dome of the Gable", was originally made of wood but nothing remains of it. It is supposed to have rested upon large cross beams.

Although architecture in the region would decline following the movement of the capital to Iraq under the Abbasids in 750, mosques built after a revival in the late 11th century usually followed the Umayyad model, especially that of the Mosque of Damascus. Domed examples include the mosques at Sarmin (1305-6) and al-Bab (1305). The typical Damascus dome is smooth and supported by a double zone of squinches: four squinches create an eight sided transition that includes eight more squinches, and these create a sixteen-sided drum with windows in alternate sides.

Byzantine influence in Europe 

Italian church architecture from the late sixth century to the end of the eighth century was influenced less by the trends of Constantinople than by a variety of Byzantine provincial plans. In Italy, there seems to have been a decline in the frequency of dome building between the 8th and 10th centuries. 

Venice, Southern Italy and Sicily served as outposts of Middle Byzantine architectural influence in Italy. Venice's close mercantile links to the Byzantine empire resulted in the architecture of that city and its vicinity being a blend of Byzantine and northern Italian influences, although nothing from the ninth and tenth centuries has survived except the foundations of the first St. Mark's Basilica. This building was presumably similar to Justinian's Church of the Holy Apostles based on its layout, but how it was roofed is unknown.

That southern Italy was reconquered and ruled by a Byzantine governor from about 970 to 1071 explains the relatively large number of small and rustic Middle Byzantine-style churches found there, including the Cattolica in Stilo and S. Marco in Rossano. Both are cross-in-square churches with five small domes on drums in a quincunx pattern and date either to the period of Byzantine rule or after.

The church architecture of Sicily has fewer examples from the Byzantine period, having been conquered by Muslims in 827, but quincunx churches exist with single domes on tall central drums and either Byzantine pendentives or Islamic squinches. Very little architecture from the Islamic period survives on the island, either.

With the crowning of Charlemagne as a new Roman Emperor, Byzantine influences were largely replaced in a revival of earlier Western building traditions, but occasional exceptions include examples of early quincunx churches at Milan and near Cassino. The extensive Byzantine use of domes on spherical pendentives after the sixth century did influence Carolingian architecture of the ninth and tenth centuries. Remains of spherical pendentives have been found in the church of Germigny-des-Prés.

Charlemagne's Palatine Chapel has a domed octagon design influenced by Byzantine models such as the Basilica of San Vitale in Ravenna, the Church of Sergius and Bacchus in Constantinople, and perhaps the Chrysotriklinos, or "golden reception hall", of the Great Palace of Constantinople. It has also been proposed that descriptions by returning travelers of the Dome of the Rock in Jerusalem, which was thought to have been the Temple of Solomon, served as the model. It was built at Charlemagne's palace at Aachen between 789 and its consecration in 805. The architect is thought to be Odo of Metz, although the quality of the ashlar construction has led to speculation about the work of outside masons. The octagonal domical vault measures 16.5 meters wide and 38 meters high. It was the largest dome north of the Alps at that time. The dimensions of the octagonal space match that of the 4th century octagonal Chapel of Saint Aquilino at the Basilica of San Lorenzo in Milan. The later central-plan cemetery church of St. Michael at Fulda was similar to the Aachen chapel, although simpler. The chapel inspired copies into the 14th century and remained a "focal-point of German kingship". The dome was rebuilt after a fire in 1656 and the interior decoration dates to around 1900.

Al-Andalus and North Africa 

Much of the Muslim architecture of Al-Andalus was lost as mosques were replaced by churches after the twelfth century, but the use of domes in surviving Mozarabic churches from the tenth century, such as the paneled dome at Santo Tomás de las Ollas and the lobed domes at the Monastery of San Miguel de Escalada, likely reflects their use in contemporary mosque architecture. The Great Mosque of Córdoba, begun in 785 under the last of the Umayyad caliphs, was enlarged by Al-Hakam II between 961 and 976 to include four domes and a remodeled mihrab. The central dome, in front of the mihrab area, transitions from a square bay with decorative squinches to eight overlapping and intersecting arches that surround and support a scalloped dome. These crossed-arch domes are the first known examples of the type and, although their possible origins in Persia or elsewhere in the east remains a matter of debate, their complexity suggests that earlier examples must have existed. The nine bays of the Mosque of Cristo de la Luz, built about 50 years later, contain a virtual catalog of crossed-arch dome variations. After the 10th century, examples can also be found in Armenia and Persia.

The dome of the Great Mosque of Kairouan (also called the Mosque of Uqba), built in the first half of the 9th century, has ribbed domes at each end of its central nave. The dome in front of the mihrab rests on an octagonal drum with slightly concave sides. After the ninth century, mosques in North Africa often have a small decorative dome over the mihrab. Additional domes are sometimes used at the corners of the mihrab wall and at the entrance bay. The square tower minarets of two or more stories are capped by small domes. Examples include the Great Mosque of Sfax in Tunisia (founded in the 9th century and later enlarged), the Djamaa el Kebir mosque (probably of the 11th century), and the Great Mosque of Tlemcen (1303). In Cairo, the martyrium of the Sharif Tabataba (943), an 18-meter square nine-domed open pavilion, is the earliest mausoleum whose plan has survived. The most common type, however, was a small domed cube.

The Fatimids conquered Egypt from North Africa in 969 and established a new architectural style for their new Caliphate. The earliest Fatimid mosque, Al-Azhar, was similar to the earlier Mosque of Ibn Tulun but introduced domed bays at both ends of the qibla wall, in addition to the dome in front of the mihrab, and this feature was later repeated among the mosques of North Africa. Later alterations to the mosque have changed its original form. The use of corner squinches to support domes was widespread in Islamic architecture by the 10th and 11th centuries.

Egypt, along with north-eastern Iran, was one of two areas notable for early developments in Islamic mausoleums, beginning in the 10th century. Fatimid mausoleums, many of which have survived in Aswan and Cairo, were mostly simple square buildings covered by a dome. Domes were smooth or ribbed and had a characteristic Fatimid "keel" shape profile. The first were built in and around Fustat. Those inside the city were decorated with carved stucco and contrast with the extreme simplicity of those outside the city, such as the four so-called Sab'a Banat (c. 1010) domed squares. Those at Aswan, mostly from the 11th century, are more developed, with ribbed domes, star-shaped openings, and octagonal drums with concave exterior sides which are corbeled outward at the top. They vary in plan as well, with domes sometimes joined with barrel vaults or with other domed mausoleums of different dimensions. The Fatimid mausoleum at Qus is in this Aswan style.

Other than the small brick domes used over the bay in front of a mihrab or over tombs, Fatimid domes were rare. An exception in size was the large dome over the Fatimid palace dynastic tomb. Literary sources describe royal domes as part of ceremonial processions and royal recreation. Examples of Fatimid palace architecture, however, described by travelers' accounts as their greatest achievement, have not survived. The ribbed or fluted domes introduced by the Fatimids may derive from a theme in earlier Coptic art, and would be continued in the later architecture of the Mamluks.

The palace at the Kalaa of the Beni Hammad contained a domed chamber.

High Middle Ages

Hispanic Marches 

The so-called first Romanesque style of churches in the early 11th century included examples in Spain with domes on squinches. The domes tend to be dark and sometimes included small windows at the base. The church of Santa Maria de Ripoll was consecrated in 1032, but was rebuilt after a fire in 1835. The church of Sant Miquel in Cruïlles was consecrated in 1035 and has a dome at its crossing covered on the exterior by a drum and short square tower. The church of Church of Sant Vicenç in Cardena was built by 1040 and there is another example at Corbera. The Corbera church may not have been intended to have a dome when the foundations were laid and the crossing bay was narrowed to create a square by the insertion of additional arches on the north and south sides. The dome was covered by a square belfry on the exterior. The small church of San Pablo in Barcelona has a central dome and triapsal arrangement resembling the churches of eastern Christianity.

East–West Schism 

The schism between the churches of Constantinople and Rome was reflected in architecture. The Greek cross and domes of Byzantine architecture were found in areas of Byzantine cultural influence. The domed church of San Giovanni a Mare in Gaeta may have been built in the second half of the 11th century. It reportedly incorporates "pottery" in its structure, a technique used in the late Roman period.

Octagonal cloister vaults appear "in connection with basilicas almost throughout Europe" between 1050 and 1100. The precise form differs from region to region. They were popular in medieval Italy, in brick. In Italy, the frequency, quality, and scope of dome construction increased beginning in the 11th century (although not in the city of Rome) and they were used in baptisteries, princely chapels, cathedrals, bell towers, and pieve churches.

Domes in Romanesque architecture were generally found within crossing towers at the intersection of a church's nave and transept, which concealed the domes externally. Called a tiburio, this tower-like structure often had a blind arcade near the roof. Romanesque domes were typically octagonal in plan and used corner squinches to translate a square bay into a suitable octagonal base. They were built across southern Europe in the 11th and 12th centuries and hundreds of examples under church crossing towers exist in Spain and southern France.

Republic of Venice 

The Veneto region was strongly influenced by the architecture of Constantinople in the 11th century.

In Venice, the second and current St. Mark's Basilica was built on the site of the first between 1063 and 1072, replacing the earlier church while replicating its Greek cross plan. Five domes vault the interior (one each over the four arms of the cross and one in the center). These domes were built in the Byzantine style, in imitation of the now lost Church of the Holy Apostles in Constantinople. Mounted over pendentives, each dome has a ring of windows at its base. These five windowed domes reflect the addition of windows (within tall drums) in the remodeled Byzantine original. However, the tall outer shells at St. Mark's were not added until after 1204. The later high wooden outer domes with lead roofing and cupolas were added to St. Mark's Basilica between 1210 and 1270, allowing the church to be seen from a great distance. In addition to allowing for a more imposing exterior, building two distinct shells in a dome improved weather protection. It was a rare practice before the 11th century. The fluted and onion-shaped cupolas of the domes may have been added in the mid-fifteenth century to complement the ogee arches added to the facade in the late Gothic period. Their shape may have been influenced by the open and domed wooden pavilions of Persia or by other eastern models. Initially, only the center dome had one.

Holy Roman Empire 

The architecture of the areas of northern Italy that were a part of the Holy Roman Empire developed differently from the rest of the Italian peninsula. The earliest use of the octagonal cloister vault within an external housing at the crossing of a cruciform church may be at Acqui Cathedral in Acqui Terme, Italy, which was completed in 1067. This became increasingly popular as a Romanesque feature over the course of the next fifty years. The first Lombard church to have a lantern tower, concealing an octagonal cloister vault, was San Nazaro in Milan, just after 1075. Many other churches followed suit in the late 11th and early 12th centuries, such as the Basilica of San Michele Maggiore in Pavia (the coronation church of the Kingdom of Italy within the Holy Roman Empire) and the Basilica of Sant'Ambrogio in Milan. At Sant'Ambrogio, the original plan for the church did not include a domed crossing and it was modified to include one, as also happened at Pisa Cathedral (funding for which was provided by Emperor Henry IV in 1089 and Emperor Henry V in 1116) and Speyer Cathedral (the burial church of the Salian dynasty of Holy Roman Emperors). The crossing domes at Pavia, Pisa, and Speyer were all completed around 1080 but the exact order of precedence is unresolved.

The domes of Pisa Cathedral and Florence Baptistery may be the two earliest domes in Tuscany and were the two largest until about 1150. Pisa Cathedral, built between 1063 and 1118, includes a high elliptical dome at the crossing of its nave and transept. The marble dome was one of the first in Romanesque architecture and is considered the masterpiece of Romanesque domes. Rising 48 meters above a rectangular bay, the shape of the dome was unique at the time. The rectangular bay's dimensions are 18 meters by 13.5 meters. Squinches were used at the corners to create an elongated octagon in a system similar to that of the contemporary Basilica of San Lorenzo in Milan and corbelling was used to create an oval base for the dome. The tambour on which the dome rests dates to between 1090 and 1100, and it is likely that the dome itself was built at that time. There is evidence that the builders did not originally plan for the dome and decided on the novel shape to accommodate the rectangular crossing bay, which would have made an octagonal cloister vault very difficult. Additionally, the dome may have originally been covered by an octagonal lantern tower that was removed in the 1300s, exposing the dome, to reduce weight on foundations not designed to support it. This would have been done no later than 1383, when the Gothic loggetta on the exterior of the dome was added, along with the buttressing arches on which it rests.

An aspiring competitor to Pisa, the city of Florence took the opposite side in the conflict between Pope and Emperor, siding with the Pope in Rome. This was reflected architecturally in the "proto-renaissance" style of its buildings. The eight-sided Florence Baptistery, with its large octagonal cloister vault beneath a pyramidal roof, was likely built between 1059 and 1128, with the dome and attic built between 1090 and 1128. The lantern above the dome is dated to 1150. It takes inspiration from the Pantheon in Rome for its oculus and much of its interior decoration, although the pointed dome is structurally similar to Lombard domes, such as that of the later Cremona Baptistery. Its ratio of wall thickness to external diameter is about 1/10, in accordance with the rules of dome proportion followed until the 17th century. One of the most important religious buildings in Florence, the proportions of its dome were followed by the nearby dome of the Cathedral of Santa Maria del Fiore that was built by Brunelleschi centuries later. The polygonal dome was built with a wooden tension ring at about 23 meters high, too high to counteract the spreading forces, and a lower iron ring was added in 1514.

The renovation of Speyer Cathedral, the largest of the Imperial Cathedrals of the Holy Roman Empire, was begun around 1080 by the Emperor Henry IV, soon after he had returned from a trip to Canossa in northern Italy. Although the church had only just been consecrated in 1061, Henry called upon craftsmen from across the empire for its renovation. The redesign included two octagonal cloister vaults within crossing towers, one at the east crossing with an external dwarf gallery and one at the west end. This was very soon imitated elsewhere and became the model for later Rhenish octagonal domes, such as those of Worms Cathedral (c. 1120–1181) and Mainz Cathedral (c. 1081–1239). Many German Imperial cathedrals feature domes at their crossings.

The crossing dome at the Church of St. Trophime in Arles is beneath a large square tower.

Kingdom of France 

The 11th and 12th century Cathedral of Le Puy uses an unusual row of six octagonal domes on squinches over its nave, with the domes at the western end being at least a century later than those at the east end. A seventh dome is located in the normal position for a Romanesque dome on squinches: over the crossing. Other examples of this use over naves are rare and scattered. One is the large church of Saint Hilaire at Poitiers, which seems to have been influenced by Le Puy Cathedral. In 1130, its wide nave was narrowed with additional piers to form suitable square bays, which were vaulted with octagonal domes whose corner sides over trumpet squinches were so narrow that the domes resemble square cloister vaults with beveled corners.

The crossing dome on squinches at the abbey church of Tournus may date to the 11th century. The Basilica of Saint-Martin d'Ainay has similar features. The largest church in France was Cluny Abbey, but it has been destroyed. The surviving transept arm of Cluny Abbey, built in the early 12th century, has an octagonal dome on trumpet squinches beneath an octagonal tower and spire and flanked on either side by barrel vaults. Autun Cathedral has a similar nave arrangement to that of Cluny Abbey.

In Auvergne, there are several Romanesque churches with domed crossings that use squinches, with the dome supported by "flying screen" walls at the crossing bay and hidden on the exterior beneath octagonal towers with buttressing "shoulders" on two sides. At Avignon Cathedral, probably from the middle of the 12th century, the rectangular crossing bay is narrowed to a square by means of two sets of four arches on opposite sides for the dome on squinches.

Duchy of Apulia and Calabria 

Its cruciform plan, use of domes, and the later addition of an external mausoleum suggest that it may have been a Norman analog to the Byzantine Church of the Holy Apostles. It appears to have inspired a series of churches in Apulia with domed naves. The date of construction has been challenged as being decades too late. The multi-domed churches of Cyprus have been proposed as the inspiration for the basilica's domes and for the three-domed naves of later churches in the region, which date mostly from the period of Norman rule, but this is also a topic of debate. San Corrado also incorporates "squinch-like niches" between the pendentives and drums of two of its three domes. The domes at Valenzano were covered by low pyramids that were rebuilt in the 1960s. The Cathedral of San Corrado was built around the year 1200. The town of  has the ruin of a small domed church that reflects a mixture of eastern and western influences.

Crusades and Reconquista 

The Crusades, beginning in 1095, also appear to have influenced domed architecture in Western Europe, particularly in the areas around the Mediterranean Sea. The Mausoleum of Bohemond (c. 1111–18), a Norman leader of the First Crusade, was built next to the Basilica of San Sabino in the southern Italian province of Apulia and has a hemispherical dome in a Byzantine style over a square building with a Greek cross plan. The dome had been covered by a pyramidal roof, according to a 1780s engraving, and the portion above the octagonal drum is a restoration. The Padua Baptistery is believed to have been built contemporaneously with the 1120s reconstruction of Padua Cathedral, a revision of the traditional foundation date of 1260. It has a dome on pendentives spanning an 11.6 meter square space, with a small altar chapel through the eastern wall. It served as a model for the later Old Sacristy of San Lorenzo.

The Crusaders built several churches in Jerusalem during the 12th century. The most complete is the Church of Saint Anne, which has a small crossing dome.

Influence of the Church of the Holy Sepulchre 

The Church of the Holy Sepulchre in Jerusalem seems to have had a wooden dome in two shells up to the 12th century, with some interruptions. After their establishing control of the city, the crusaders added a choir with a dome next to the existing rotunda. The French Romanesque addition replaced the eastern apse of the rotunda and a courtyard marking the center of the world and was consecrated on July 15, 1149, the fiftieth anniversary of the capture of the city. The new dome's diameter of 10.4 meters was half that of the rotunda and it rested on four pointed arches on four pillars. It served as the coronation site for the crusader kings of Jerusalem and its relation to the larger dome over the rotunda may have been intended to mirror the relationship between the domes of the Dome of the Rock and the Al-Aqsa Mosque on the Temple Mount.

The rotunda itself was covered by a conical structure from the 12th to the early 19th century. Pisa Baptistry was built in 1153 with a truncated cone in clear imitation of the Holy Sepulchre; an outer dome shell was added in the 14th century. The domed baptisteries of Cremona (1176) and Parma (1196) also appear to have been influenced by the rotunda. The 12th century rotunda of the Holy Sepulchre at Santo Stefano, Bologna, and the basilica at Neuvy-Saint-Sépulchre are imitations of Jerusalem's Church of the Holy Sepulchre although, like many of the imitations across Europe, they differ in their details, including their domes. Most of these "so-called 'copies'" have a dome or domical vault. An example is a church at Almenno, Italy, which has a stone dome resting on eight supporting columns.

The Dome of the Rock and the Al-Aqsa Mosque on the Temple Mount of Jerusalem were taken by the crusaders to represent the Temple of Solomon and the Palace of Solomon, respectively. The Knights Templar, headquartered at the site, built a series of centrally planned churches throughout Europe modeled on the Church of the Holy Sepulchre, with the Dome of the Rock also an influence. The Church of Saint Mary of Eunate was a pilgrims' burial church, rather than a Templar church, but may have been influenced by them. The Church of the Holy Sepulchre in Cambridge and the  contain ribbed domes.

Kingdom of Italy in the Holy Roman Empire 

Churches in northern Italy after 1100 were designed with vaulting from the outset, rather than as colonnaded basilicas with timber roofs and, like the Rhenish imperial cathedrals, many have octagonal domes with squinches over their crossings or choirs. Examples include Parma Cathedral, rebuilt around 1130, and Piacenza Cathedral (1122-1235). Another example is the domed church of San Fedele in Como (11th to 12th century), similar to the church of St. Maria im Kapitol. The Baptistery of Parma, one of the largest baptisteries, was begun in 1196 and has dome frescoes dating from 1260 onwards.

The Old Cathedral of Brescia was likely built in the first quarter of the 12th century and has a dome over a meter thick, made of heavy stone at the bottom and lighter porous stone at the top. In Tarquinia, the oval stone dome on squinches over the church of San Giacomo (c. 1121–1140) may have been inspired by the dome of Pisa Cathedral. A dome on pendentives in Tarquinia was completed around 1190 as part of the cathedral of Sta. Maria di Castello and was similar to others in Tuscany and the Veneto. It was destroyed by an earthquake in 1819.

The dome of the Basilica of San Lorenzo in Milan, a tetraconch building with a central space 23.8 meters square, was rebuilt in the Romanesque style after a fire in 1124. Much admired in the Renaissance, its dome collapsed in 1573 and was rebuilt with the present cloister vault. Documentary evidence indicates that the Romanesque dome of San Lorenzo was a thin hemisphere of light material over a cube of space about 23.8 meters (40 Milanese braccia) on each side. The dome was supported by four corner squinches resting on the four exedrae arches of the square space with a further eight smaller squinches between each of them to create a sixteen-sided base. It was covered on the exterior by a cylindrical or polygonal drum and timber roof. The exterior drum was likely polygonal, with eight or sixteen sides, and had two levels of dwarf galleries beneath a cornice row of hanging arches. Evidence remains in the building's eastern corner towers of flying buttresses extending diagonally to the drum. The existence of a small lantern at the top of the dome is uncertain and the date the dome was completed is unknown.

The cathedral of Sovana (1153-1175) and the church of San Salvatore at Terni (about 1200) were constructed with local materials and have precedents in the region. It was built in the 1180s as a commemorative chapel with a hemispherical dome over a cylindrical rotunda and the top 16 rings are all in brick, giving the impression of an oculus at the top of the dome.

Kingdom of France and the Angevin Empire 

The crossing dome at Obazine Abbey has pendentives, which became popular in France throughout the 12th century. By the middle of the 12th century, the use of drums with windows beneath the domes allowed in more light. Octagonal drums were preferred. In the latter three examples, the crossing dome is supported on the north and south sides by an adjacent half or full barrel vaults.

In the Aquitaine region of southwest France, there are a large number of unusual domed Romanesque churches; over 250 in the Périgord region alone. The area is far from ports with regular contact with the East and the source of influence is not entirely settled. The oval shape appears to have been a practical solution to rectangular crossing bays. The use of pendentives to support domes in the Aquitaine region, rather than the squinches more typical of western medieval architecture, strongly implies a Byzantine influence. The oldest French pendentives are built in horizontal courses, rather than courses normal to the curve. This may have been done to better spread the weight of each course and also allow for a lighter wooden centering to be used during construction.

Between the Garonne and Loire rivers there are known to have been at least seventy-seven churches whose naves were covered by a line of domes. Half of them are in the Périgord region. Most date to the twelfth century and sixty of them survive today. That the domes in this area were arranged in linear series has suggested the contemporary architecture of Cyprus as the inspiration, which was located on a pilgrimage route to the Holy Land. Cyprus had developed its own style of domed basilica during its period of neutrality between Byzantine and Arab rulers, using three domes of roughly equal size in a line over the nave and very little lighting. There are indications of a connection between Aquitaine and Cyprus just after the First Crusade.

The earliest of these French churches may be Angoulême Cathedral, built from 1105 to 1128. Its long nave is covered by four stone domes on pendentives, springing from pointed arches, the last of which covers the crossing and is surmounted by a stone lantern. Possible earlier domes may have existed at the church of Saint-Astier, Dordogne, which was founded in 1010 although little of the original construction remains, and at Saint-Avit-Sénieur (c. 1117), whose original three domes were replaced with "domed up Anjou vaults" in the 13th century. The westernmost of the Angoulême domes is the earliest, constructed between 1100 and 1125. Four small recesses at the base of each nave dome, just above the cornices, was likely used to secure wooden centering formwork during construction. Later stone domes in the region have four small windows in a similar location that may have been used in the same way. The domes of the church of  preceded the larger ones at Cahors Cathedral. St. Étienne originally had four domes, but two were destroyed in the 16th century. Of the remaining two, the earlier one was completed around 1125 the later one by 1163. Cahors Cathedral (c. 1100–1119) covers its nave with two large domes in the same manner and influenced the later . The domes at Cahors have a diameter of more than fifty feet. The abbey church at Fontevrault served as a burial place for Plantagenet royalty, including Richard the Lionheart, and is one of the most impressive examples. The earlier domed crossing is preceded by a wider nave covered by four domes, which was begun in 1125. The pendentives are original, but the four nave domes are modern replacements from about 1910. Originally designed as a three-aisled hall church with barrel vaults, after the choir was completed the nave was redesigned with piers to support the line of domes spanning the full width. Likewise at the Abbaye aux Dames in Saintes, the abbey church was remodeled during construction to allow for the domes.

The cathedral of S. Front at Périgueux was built c. 1125–1150 and derives its five-domed cruciform plan ultimately from the Church of the Holy Apostles in Constantinople. One of the domes covers part of the choir, the rest of which is covered by a barrel vault and apse half-dome, although most domed churches in the region used only a barrel vault and apse half-dome for the choir. The domes differ from normal Byzantine practice in the use of stone, rather than a lighter material such as brick, and that difference may help explain the other differences, such as the domes being slightly pointed and at least semicircular, rather than segmental, springing from a distance set back from the circle formed by the pendentives, rather than directly from the circle, and resting on pendentives with complex curves that begin at the lower side of the supporting arch voussoirs, rather than quarter-circle pendentives beginning at the upper side. The S. Front domes had dressed stone only on the lowest levels prior to alterations by Paul Abadie in the 19th century. The lanterns on the domes at Souillac were likewise added by 19th century restoration. There are indications that the domes were originally covered by a wooden roof.

Gothic rib vaulting superseded the use of domes in south-west France after the 12th century. The church at Saint-Avit-Sénieur appears to have been designed for domes but they may never have been built. The nave is covered instead by ribbed Angevin style vaults. The "domical shape of Angevin vaults", like those seen in Angers Cathedral, may be due to the influence of Romanesque domed churches. The foundations of Bordeaux Cathedral indicate that it originally had a nave covered with a line of three domes like those of Angoulême Cathedral but it was rebuilt in the 13th century with a vaulted ceiling.

Kingdom of León and the Emperors of all Spain 

The remains of a crossing tower on the French Church of Saint-Jean de Montierneuf from about 1140 suggest an origin for some Spanish domes in a Romanesque and transitional Gothic style. The architectural influences at work here have been much debated, with proposed origins ranging from Jerusalem, Islamic Spain, or the Limousin region in western France to a mixture of sources. 
The disappeared Romanesque dome over the Cathedral of Santiago de Compostela has also been proposed.

During the Reconquista, the Kingdom of León in northern Spain built three churches famous for their domed crossing towers, called , as it acquired new territories. The Cathedral of Zamora, the Cathedral of Salamanca, and the collegiate church of Toro were built around the middle of the 12th century. All three buildings have stone umbrella domes with sixteen ribs over windowed drums of either one or two stories, springing from pendentives. All three also have four small round towers engaged externally to the drums of the domes on their diagonal sides. A later related dome is that over the chapter house of the Old Cathedral of Plasencia.
The early Gothic Cathedral of Évora in Portugal has been proposed as a late addition to the set. Perhaps the masterpiece of the series, the Salamanca crossing tower has two stories of windows in its drum. Its outer stone fish-scale roof lined with gothic crockets is a separate corbelled layer with only eight lobes, which applies weight to the haunches of the sixteen-sided inner dome. The vaulting over the nave of the old Salamanca Cathedral is covered by domes supported by diagonal ribs in the western bays and Anjou-style domed-up rib vaults in the two eastern bays. 

The Way, a major pilgrimage route through northern Spain to the reputed burial place of St. James the Greater, attracted pilgrims from throughout Europe, especially after pilgrimage to Jerusalem was cut off. The difficulty of travel to Jerusalem for pilgrimage prompted some new churches to be built as a form of substitute, evoking the central plan and dome of Jerusalem's Church of the Holy Sepulchre with their own variant. The dome in this case, however, is most evocative of the central mihrab dome of the Great Mosque of Cordoba. Over an octagonal room, the stone dome is formed by sixteen ribs, eight of which intersect with one another in a star pattern to define a smaller octagon at the center of the dome. This is one of a number of Christian crossed-arch dome examples in Spain and the south of France from the end of the 12th century, with patterns based upon the square or octagon. Contemporary Islamic examples in Spain and North Africa are distinguished from the Christian by the use of thinner and more numerous arches, such as those of the Alcázar of Seville, the Villena Castle in Alicante, the Great Mosque of Taza, and the minaret of Koutoubia Mosque. The style experienced a revival in early 16th century Spain when one of the crossed-arch domes of the Great Mosque of Córdoba was used as the model for domes at Zaragoza, Teruel, and Tarazona.

Kingdom of Sicily 

The Christian domed basilicas built in Sicily after the Norman Conquest also incorporate distinctly Islamic architectural elements. They include hemispherical domes positioned directly in front of apses, similar to the common positioning in mosques of domes directly in front of mihrabs, and the domes use four squinches for support, as do the domes of Islamic North Africa and Egypt. In other cases, domes exhibit Byzantine influences with tall drums, engaged columns, and blind arcades. The influence of the domed mosques of the Aghlabids has been cited to explain the design of the domes; representative examples of Islamic domes from North Africa can be seen in the Al-Hakim Mosque and the Great Mosque of Sousse.

Domes were used in a variety of compositions and were often not the center or focus of the architecture. The church of San Pietro in Itala has a central, tower-like dome. The church of Santi Pietro and Paolo in Casalvecchio has two domes, with a smaller eight-sided umbrella dome with muqarnas-like supports in the space before the altar and a larger umbrella dome on squinches over the nave. The dome over the nave has a circular base and the dome over the altar has an octagonal base.

Examples at Palermo include the Palatine Chapel (1132–1143), La Martorana (c. 1140s), and Zisa, Palermo (12th century). The church of San Giovanni degli Eremiti has five domes in a T-shaped arrangement and the Church of San Cataldo has three domes on squinches, with both showing clearly Islamic influence.

North Africa, Syria, and Al-Jazira 

The so-called shrine of Imam al-Dawr in the village of al-Dawr, Iraq, is the earliest known example of a muqarnas dome, although it is unlikely to have been the first of its type. The dome rests on an octagonal base created by four squinches over a square bay. Three levels of muqarnas rise over this and are capped by a small cupola. The muqarnas cells are very large and resemble small squinches themselves. It was finished by 1090 by the court of an Uqaylid vassal of the Abbasid Caliphate of Baghdad and, although there are no surviving examples from Baghdad at this time, the large number of muqarnas domes known to have existed there by the end of the Middle Ages suggests that it could have been the source of the type.

In Islamic North Africa, there are several early muqarnas domes dating from the twelfth century. The earliest may be an Almoravid restoration between 1135 and 1140 of a series of stucco muqarnas domes over the axial nave of the mosque of the Qarawiyyin in Fez. The existence of a near contemporary example from 1154 in the maristan of Nur al-din in Damascus, Syria, and the earlier example of a muqarnas dome in al-Dawr, Iraq, suggests that the style was imported from Baghdad.

Most of the examples of muqarnas domes are found in Iraq and the Jazira, dated from the middle of the twelfth century to the Mongol invasion. The use of stucco to form the muqarnas pattern, suspended by a wooden framework from the exterior vault, was the least common in Iraq, although it would be very popular in North Africa and Spain. Because it used two shells, however, windows were restricted to the bases of the domes. They were otherwise used frequently in this type. In Iraq, the most common form was a single shell of brick, with the reverse of the interior pattern visible on the exterior. The Damascus mausoleum of Nur al-Din (1172) and the shrine of Zumurrud Khatun in Baghdad are examples. A third type is found only in Mosul from the beginning of the thirteenth century. It has a brick pyramidal roof, usually covered in green glazed tiles. Of the five preserved examples, the finest is the shrine of Awn al-Din, which used tiny colored tiles to cover the muqarnas cells themselves and incorporates small muqarnas domes into the tiers of muqarnas supporting the large eight-sided star at the center. This design led to a further development at the shrine of Shaykh Abd al-Samad in Natanz, Iran.

The architecture of Syria and the Jazira includes the widest variety of forms in the medieval Islamic world, being influenced by the surviving architecture of Late Antiquity, contemporary Christian buildings, and Islamic architecture from the east. There are some muqarnas domes of the Iraqi type, but most domes are slightly pointed hemispheres on either muqarnas pendentives or double zones of squinches and made of masonry, rather than brick and plaster. The domes cover single bay structures or are just a part of larger constructions. Syrian mausoleums consist of a square stone chamber with a single entrance and a mihrab and a brick lobed dome with two rows of squinches. The dome at the Silvan Mosque, 13.5 meters wide and built from 1152 to 1157, has an unusual design similar to the dome added to the Friday Mosque of Isfahan in 1086-1087: once surrounded by roofless aisles on three sides, it may have been meant to be an independent structure. The congregational mosque at Kızıltepe, with its well integrated dome of about 10 meters, is the masterpiece of Artuqid architecture.

After his conquest of the city of Jerusalem, Saladin rebuilt the dome of the Al-Aqsa Mosque as it is today, as part of extensive restorations.

The largest preserved Ayyubid dome is that of the Matbakh al-'Ajami in Aleppo, resting on muqarnas pendentives. It may have been the palace residence of the al-'Ajami family. The mausoleum over the tomb of Iman Al-Shafi‘i (built in 1211) has a large wooden double dome (rebuilt in 1722) about 29 meters high and, with the tombs of al-Malik al-Silah and the so-called Tomb of the Abbasid Caliphs, is one of three important Ayyubid tombs in Cairo dating from the first half of the 13th century. The domed mausoleum was built 35 years after the madrassa ordered by Saladin at the site in 1176–7, which were introduced in Egypt after 1171 to counter Shia Islam. The only madrassa from the period to partly survive is the 1242 construction by As-Salih Ayyub on the site of the Fatimid Eastern Palace. The 10 meter wide domed tomb at its northern end led to the series of funerary madrassas built in Cairo by the Mamluk Sultans.

Late Romanesque and Gothic Europe 

The use of domes declined in Western Europe with the rise of Gothic architecture. Gothic domes are uncommon due to the use of rib vaults over naves, and with church crossings usually focused instead by tall steeples, but there are examples of small octagonal crossing domes in cathedrals as the style developed from the Romanesque. The domes of Romanesque and Early Gothic latin-cross churches rarely span more than the width of the nave. 

Spaces of circular or octagonal plan were sometimes covered with vaults of a "double chevet" style, similar to the chevet apse vaulting in Gothic cathedrals. The dome of Tarragona Cathedral was built in the French Gothic style and includes alternating sets of three and four windows at the base. The domed "Decagon" nave of St. Gereon's Basilica in Cologne, Germany, a ten-sided space in an oval shape, was built between 1219 and 1227 upon the remaining low walls of a 4th-century Roman mausoleum. The ribbed domical vault rises four stories and 34 meters above the floor, covering an oval area 23.5 meters long and 18.7 meters wide. It is unique among the twelve Romanesque churches of Cologne, and in European architecture in general, and may have been the largest dome built in this period in Western Europe until the completion of the dome of Florence Cathedral. Later examples include those of the Pazzi Chapel in Florence (c. 1420), Évreux Cathedral (second half of the 15th century), Cathedral of the Savior of Zaragoza (after 1500), and Burgos Cathedral (completed in 1568). An octagonal gothic dome 65 feet in diameter was planned but never finished at Batalha Monastery in Portugal, to house royal tombs.

In Italy, the dome of Siena Cathedral had an exposed profile as early as 1224, and this feature was retained in its reconstruction around 1260. The dome has two shells and was completed in 1264. It is set over an irregular  hexagon with squinches to form an irregular twelve-sided base. No large dome had ever before been built over a hexagonal crossing. The current lantern dates from the 17th century and the current outer dome is a 19th-century replacement. An octagonal dome for Florence Cathedral may have been part of the original design by Arnolfo di Cambio for the church, construction of which began in 1296. The Basilica of St. Anthony of Padua was built between 1231 and 1300, in the early period of Italian Gothic architecture, and features seven domes with a blend of Gothic and Byzantine elements. Similar to St Mark's Basilica in Venice, its nave, transepts, crossing, and the intermediate bay before the choir are covered by domes on pendentives in the Byzantine style. Externally, the crossing dome is covered with a conical spire. The choir dome, which may be later than the others, is uniquely Gothic with ribs. An eighth dome covers the attached Relics Chapel, adjacent to the choir dome. The masonry domes are covered externally by timber structures and several were repaired following a 1347 lightning strike and a 1748 fire. The two nearest the facade may be in their original condition. The Baptistery of San Giovanni in Corte in Pistoia has an octagonal dome in the Florentine style. Venice's Church of Santi Giovanni e Paolo was built between 1333 and 1430 and features a domed crossing with Byzantine and Romanesque influences, such as the domed Romanesque cathedrals of the northern plain.

In England, a dome with a pyramidal roof and lantern at the Abbot's kitchen of Glastonbury Abbey dates to the early 14th century. Similar vaulting was built over the kitchen of Newenham Abbey by 1338. Timber star vaults such as those over York Minster's octagonal Chapter house (ca. 1286–1296) and the elongated octagon plan of Wells Cathedral's Lady Chapel (ca. 1320–1340) imitated much heavier stone vaulting. The wooden vaulting over the crossing of Ely Cathedral was built after the original crossing tower collapsed in 1322. It was conceived by Alan of Walsingham and designed by master carpenter William Hurley. Eight hammer vaults extend from eight piers over the 22 meter wide octagonal crossing and meet at the base of a large octagonal lantern, which is covered by a star vault.

Late Middle Ages

Andalusia 

Star-shaped domes are found at the Moorish palace of the Alhambra in Granada, Spain, which contains domed audience halls built to mirror the heavenly constellations. The Hall of the Abencerrajes (c. 1333–91) and the Hall of the two Sisters (c. 1333–54) are extraordinarily developed examples of muqarnas domes, taking the tradition of the squinch in Islamic architecture from a functional element in the zone of transition to a highly ornamental covering for the dome itself. The structural elements of these two domes are actually brick vaulting, but these are completely covered by the intricate mocárabe stalactites. The lacy and star-shaped crossing dome of Burgos Cathedral (1567) may have been inspired by these examples, in addition to that built over the cathedral's octagonal Chapel of the Condestable (1482–94) in the Gothic style.

In the mudéjar style of Seville after the Christian reconquest of the city, a kind of dome made of intricately interlaced pieces of painted and gilded wood was known as a media naranja, or "half orange". The most famous example covers the "Hall of the Ambassadors" throne room in the Royal Palace Complex of Seville, a 10 meter wide space built in 1427.

Mamluk Sultanate 

In the first half of the fourteenth century, stone blocks replaced bricks as the primary building material in the dome construction of Mamluk Egypt, with the brick domes being only 20 percent of those constructed around 1322. Over the course of 250 years, around 400 domes were built in Cairo to cover the tombs of Mamluk sultans and emirs. Although they kept roughly the same proportions, the shift from brick to stone is also associated with an increase in the average span and height of about 3 to 4 meters, and a decrease in the thickness of the domes. The stone domes are generally 8 to 10 meters in diameter and 7 to 11 meters high. The Mausoleum of Farag Ibn Barquq (1398–1411) is an exceptional case, with a dome 16 meters wide and 12.8 meters tall. The dome over the tomb of An-Nasir Hasan is 69 feet wide and dates to 1356.

The stone domes are generally single shells except at the conical crown, where there is a gap between inner and outer layers filled with earth and rubble and which contains the bases of the metal spires. Double shelled domes are rare, but an example is that of Al-Sultanyya Madrasa from 1360. The domes were constructed in circular rings, with the sizes decreasing towards the top of the dome and, because of this, it is possible that elaborate centering may not have been needed. Collapsed remains of some domes has revealed a layer of brick beneath the external stone, which could have supported and aligned the heavier stone during construction. Although the earliest stone domes do not have them, horizontal connections between the ashlar stone blocks were introduced in the fourteenth century, such as those made of teak wood in a dovetail shape used in the Mausoleum of Farag Ibn Barquq. Dome profiles were varied, with "keel-shaped", bulbous, ogee, stilted domes, and others being used. On the drum, angles were chamfered, or sometimes stepped, externally and triple windows used in a tri-lobed arrangement on the faces.

Decoration for these first stone domes was initially the same external ribbing as earlier brick domes, and such brick domes would continue to be built throughout the Mamluk period, but more elaborate patterns of carving were introduced through the beginning of the sixteenth century. Early stones domes were plastered externally when not cut precisely enough, but improvements in technique over time would make this unnecessary. Spiral ribs were developed in the 1370s and zigzag patterns were common both by the end of the fourteenth century and again at the end of the fifteenth century. In the fifteenth century, interlaced star and floral designs were used in a tiled pattern. The uniqueness of a pattern on a mausoleum dome helped to associate that dome with the individual buried there.

The twin-domes of the Sultaniyya complex (c. 1360) and the narrow dome of Yunus al-Dawadar (c. 1385) are unusual in that they have muqarnas at the base of their external ribs, a feature of ribbed domes in Persia. The first example of the zigzag pattern is on the dome of Mahmud al-Kurdi (1394–95), and at least fourteen subsequent domes also used it. The first example of a dome in Cairo with a star pattern is the mausoleum of al-Ashraf Barsbay. The dome of Qaytbay in Cairo's northern cemetery combines geometric and arabesque patterns and is one of the finest. Internally, the squinches of the zone of transition developed into miniaturized and pointed versions that were used row upon row over the entire expanded zone and bordered above and below by plain surfaces. Bulbous cupolas on minarets were used in Egypt beginning around 1330, spreading to Syria in the following century.

Kingdom of Italy in the Holy Roman Empire

Tuscany 

Exposed domes were common in Tuscany and a source of regional distinctiveness by the 1380s. The exposed outer dome of Pisa Baptistery was built over its earlier inner conical roof in the 14th century. If an external lantern tower was also removed from Pisa Cathedral in the 1300s, exposing the dome, one reason may have been to stay current with more recent projects in the region, such as the domed cathedrals of Siena and Florence.  Rapid progress on a radical expansion of Siena Cathedral, which would have involved replacing the existing dome with a larger one, was halted not long after the city was struck with an outbreak of the Black Death in 1348. Its dome was originally topped with a copper orb, similar to that over Pisa's dome today, but this was replaced in 1385 by a cupola surmounted by a smaller sphere and cross.

It was only a few years after the city of Siena had decided to abandon the massive expansion and redesign of their cathedral in 1355 that Florence decided to greatly expand theirs. A plan for the dome of Florence Cathedral was settled by 1357. However, in 1367 it was proposed to alter the church plan at the east end to increase the scale of the octagonal dome, widening it from 62 to 72 braccia, with the intent to further surpass the domes of Pisa and Siena, and this modified plan was ratified in 1368, under Master of Works Francesco Talenti. The construction guilds of Florence had sworn to adhere to the model of the dome created in 1367, with a "quinto acuto" pointed profile, but the scale of this new dome was so ambitious that experts for the Opera del Duomo, the board supervising the construction, expressed the opinion as early as 1394 that the dome could not be accomplished. Discussion in the fourteenth century revolved primarily around the cost of the project, and secondarily about the style. The enlarged dome would span the entire  width of the three aisled nave, just 2 meters less than that of the Roman Pantheon, the largest dome in the world. At 144 braccia, the height of the dome would evoke the holy number of the Heavenly Jerusalem mentioned in the Book of Revelation. By 1413, with the exception of one of the three apses, the east end of the church had been completed up to the windowed octagonal drum but the problem of building the huge dome did not yet have a solution. In 1417, with the drum completed, the master builder in charge of the project retired and a competition for plans to build the dome was begun in August 1418.

Filippo Brunelleschi proposed avoiding the problem of building an independent wooden scaffolding sufficiently strong to support the dome during construction, which may not have been possible, by using lower levels of the dome itself to support construction of higher levels. To demonstrate the idea, he built a dome without scaffolding over the Ridolfi chapel in the Church of San Jacopo sopr'Arno. Brunelleschi's plan to use suspended scaffolding for the workers won out over alternatives such as building a provisional stone support column in the center of the crossing or filling the space with earth, and he and Lorenzo Ghiberti were made joint leaders of the project to build the dome for Florence Cathedral in 1420. The octagonal brick domical vault was built between 1420 and 1436, with Ghiberti resigning in 1433. Brunelleschi's dome, designed in 1418, follows the height and form mandated in 1367. The dome can be described as a cloister vault, with the eight ribs at the angles concentrating weight on the supporting piers. The dome is 42 meters wide and made of two shells. A stairway winds between them. Eight white stone external ribs mark the edges of the eight sides, next to the red tile roofing, and extend from the base of the dome to the base of the cupola. Each of the eight sides of the dome also conceal a pair of intermediate stone ribs that are connected to the main ribs by means of a series of masonry rings. A temporary wooden tension ring still exists near the bottom of the dome. Three horizontal chains of sandstone blocks notched together and reinforced with lead-coated iron cramps also extend the entire circumference of the dome: one at the base (where radial struts from this chain protrude to the exterior), one a third of the way up the dome, and one two thirds of the way up the dome. Although generally preferred in Italy at the time, no visible internal ties were used. Only four major cracks have been observed on the inner dome, compared to about fourteen each on the domes of the Pantheon and St. Peter's Basilica. The design of the dome is very different from that of the Pantheon and it is unclear what the influences were, but it does share some similarities with earlier and smaller brick domes in Persia. The use of a herringbone pattern in the brick allowed for short horizontal sections of the layers of the dome to be completed as self-supporting units. Over 32 meters in height, it remains the largest masonry dome ever built.

At the conclusion of the Council of Florence on June 6, 1439, the ceremony of union between the Catholic and Orthodox churches took place beneath the dome of Florence Cathedral. In the Old Sacristy of the Basilica of San Lorenzo in Florence, the smaller dome above the altar is decorated with astrological depictions of star constellations that have been calculated to represent July 6, 1439 at about noon, the date of the closing session of the Council of Florence, in which the Articles of Union between Eastern and Western Christendom were signed by Latin and Greek delegates.

The dome of Florence Cathedral is not itself Renaissance in style, although the lantern is closer. The lantern surmounting the dome, also designed by Brunelleschi, was not begun until 1446, after his death. It was completed by Michelozzo di Bartolommeo and Bernardo Rossellino in 1467. Brunelleschi also planned for an external gallery, or ballatoio, to be built at the top of the drum where a strip of unclad masonry can be seen today. He had not worked out the details before his death, having been focused on the dome and lantern, but it appears that his intention was for a two-story passage with the lower story covered and the upper story open to the sky. In 1507, the commission for the ballatoio was awarded to Il Cronaca, Giuliano da Sangallo, and Baccio D'Agnolo, but only the southeast side was completed by June 1515. The unveiling of the finished section spurred criticism of the design, including by Michelangelo, who proposed an unsuccessful alternative design, and work remained suspended as the ruling Medici focused on other projects.

Early renaissance 

Brunelleschi's domes at San Lorenzo and the Pazzi Chapel established them as a key element of Renaissance architecture. The aisles of his churches of San Lorenzo (begun 1421) and Santo Spirito (begun 1428) were covered by sail domes. Brunelleschi's umbrella dome on pendentives over the Old Sacristy of the Basilica of San Lorenzo (1422-1428) became the archetype for later domed church crossings by his followers. His plan for the dome of the Pazzi Chapel in Florence's Basilica of Santa Croce (1430–52) illustrates the Renaissance enthusiasm for geometry and for the circle as geometry's supreme form. Twelve ribs between twelve circular windows converge on a small oculus. The circular dome rests on pendentives decorated with circular medallions of Florentine ceramic. This emphasis on geometric essentials would be very influential. Another early example is Giuliano da Sangallo's 1485 design of a dome on the church of Santa Maria delle Carceri in Prato. Like that of the Pazzi Chapel, the dome is ribbed. The domed  was built in the late 15th century.

The combination of dome, drum, pendentives, and barrel vaults developed as the characteristic structural forms of large Renaissance churches following a period of innovation in the later fifteenth century. Florence was the first Italian city to develop the new style, followed by Rome, then Venice. The quincunx plan became popular in many parts of Italy from the end of the 15th century, often with a large dome on pendentives at the center of a square and four smaller domes at the corners. From the late 15th century, semicircular arches became preferred in Milan, but round domes were less successful due to structural difficulties compared to those with pointed profiles. Domes in the renaissance style in Florence are mostly from the early period, in the fifteenth century. Cities within Florence's zone of influence, such as Genoa, Milan, and Turin, mainly produced examples later, from the sixteenth century on.

De re aedificatoria, written by Leon Battista Alberti and dedicated to Pope Nicholas V around 1452, recommends vaults with coffering for churches, as in the Pantheon, and the first design for a dome at St. Peter's Basilica in Rome is usually attributed to him, although the recorded architect is Bernardo Rossellino. Under Pope Nicholas V, construction started between 1451 and 1455 on an extension of the old St. Peter's Basilica to create a Latin cross plan with a dome and lantern 100 braccia high over a crossing 44 braccia wide (about 24.5 meters wide). Little more than foundations and part of the choir walls were completed before work stopped with the death of Nicholas V. This innovation would culminate in Bramante's 1505–6 projects for a wholly new St. Peter's Basilica, and throughout the sixteenth century the Renaissance set of dome and barrel vault would displace use of Gothic ribbed vaults. The segmental dome of Nicolas V's Church of San Teodoro al Palatino in Rome (begun in 1453) is the first known to be built within the city since the middle of the 5th century. Under Pope Sixtus IV additional domed churches were commissioned, such as Santa Maria del Popolo (1472-1478) with its octagonal cloister vault on pendentives, the domed Augustinian basilica of Sant'Agostino, and Santa Maria della Pace (completed around 1490), also an octagonal cloister vault but over an octagonal foundation.

Venetian Renaissance architecture, perhaps delayed due to Venice's political independence, was blended with the existing Venetian architectural tradition of Eastern influence. Pietro Lombardo designed the church of Santa Maria dei Miracoli (1481–89) with a dome over the sacristy. The masonry dome on a shallow drum and pendentives is covered by a taller outer wooden dome with a lantern. In the late fifteenth century, several small central-plan churches were built in Venice with low domes on pendentives in a Byzantine style, such as the churches of San Giobbe, San Giovanni Crisostomo, and Santa Maria Formosa.

Duchy of Urbino 

The  was completed in Urbino before 1481 as a domed trilobe mausoleum.

Begun in 1469, the Basilica of the Holy House at Loreto has an octagonal dome with a Gothic profile similar to that of Florence Cathedral. It was built by Giuliano da Sangallo from 1499 to 1500, and its structure uses a herringbone pattern and contains two iron chains to resist outward thrust. The four towers at the corners of the crossing also contain octagonal cloister vaults at their intermediate level.

Duchy of Milan 

In Lombardy, both octagonal and circular domes used ribs as late as the 1490s. Examples include the Portinari Chapel at the Basilica of Sant'Eustorgio, the church of Certosa di Pavia (1396–1473), the church of Sta. Maria Bressanoro at Castelleone, Milan Cathedral, and the church of Santa Maria della Croce. Leonardo da Vinci, Bramante, and others were involved in Pavia Cathedral, construction of which began in 1488. The Portinari Chapel, Colleoni Chapel, and  use a large square block to support a timburio. Donato Bramante's dome of Santa Maria presso San Satiro was the first Lombard "ribless hemispherical cupola with coffers". The burial church of the House of Sforza, Santa Maria delle Grazie, was begun in 1492 and by 1497 was completed to the upper gallery of the timburio. It is similar to the earlier Church of San Bernardino in Urbino in that it is also a domed trilobe mausoleum. However, the smooth, almost-hemispherical dome without ribs and the sixteen-sided timburio with two galleries and a pitched roof are clearly modeled on the earlier Church of San Lorenzo in Milan, called the "Milanese Pantheon", and the interior arrangement is similar to that of the Portinari Chapel.

Low Countries of northwest Europe 

In the fifteenth century, pilgrimages to and flourishing trade relations with the Near East exposed the Low Countries of northwest Europe to the use of bulbous domes in the architecture of the Orient. Although the first expressions of their European use are in the backgrounds of paintings, architectural uses followed. The Dome of the Rock and its bulbous dome being so prominent in Jerusalem, such domes apparently became associated by visitors with the city itself. In Bruges, The , designed to symbolize the Holy Sepulchre, was finished with a Gothic church tower capped by a bulbous cupola on a hexagonal shaft in 1428. Sometime between 1466 and 1500, a tower added to the Chapel of the Precious Blood was covered by a bulbous cupola very similar to Syrian minarets. Likewise, in Ghent, an octagonal staircase tower for the Church of St. Martin d'Ackerghem, built in the beginning of the sixteenth century, has a bulbous cupola like a minaret. These cupolas were made of wood covered with copper, as were the examples over turrets and towers in the Netherlands at the end of the fifteenth century, many of which have been lost. The earliest example from the Netherlands that has survived is the bulbous cupola built in 1511 over the town hall of Middelburg. Multi-story spires with truncated bulbous cupolas supporting smaller cupolas or crowns became popular in the following decades.

See also 
 History of architecture

References

Citations

Sources

 
 
 
 
 
 
 
 
 
 
 
 
 
 
 
 
 
 
 
 
 
 
 
 
 
 
 
 
 
 
 
 
 
 
 
 
 
 
 
 
 
 
 
 
 
 
 
 
 
 
 
 
 
 
 
 
 
 
 
 
 
 
 
 
 
 
 
 
 
 
 
 
 
 
 
 
 
 
 
 
 
 
 
 
 
 
 
 
 
 
 
 
 
 
 
 
 
 
 
 
 
 
 
 
 
 
 
 
 
 

Domes
Medieval architecture
Arabic architecture
Church architecture
Mosque architecture
Islamic architectural elements